Mary Wynne Warner (22 June 1932 – 1 April 1998) was a Welsh mathematician, specializing in fuzzy mathematics. Her obituary in the Bulletin of the London Mathematical Society noted that fuzzy topology was "the field in which she was one of the pioneers and recognized as one of the leading figures for the past thirty years."

Early life and education
Mary Wynne Davies was born in Carmarthen, Wales, the elder daughter of Sydney and Esther Davies. She was raised at Llandovery, where her father was a schoolmaster. She was educated at Howell's Boarding School in Denbigh.

She won a scholarship to study at Somerville College, Oxford, where she concentrated on topology in her mathematical studies with Henry Whitehead, earning a second-class degree in 1953. She earned her doctorate at the University of Warsaw, with a dissertation titled "The Homology of Cartesian Product Spaces" (1966).

Career
Mary Wynne Warner's career was shaped by her husband's diplomatic assignments. She did research in Beijing, where her husband was posted. In Rangoon, another diplomatic posting, she taught higher mathematics. For a while in the 1970s, she held teaching appointments at two universities in Kuala Lumpur. During extended stays in England, she taught at the City University London, where she finally became a professor in 1996.

Personal life
Mary Wynne Davies married diplomat and intelligence officer Sir Gerald Warner in 1956. They had three children, Sian (b. 1958), Jonathan (b. 1959), and Rachel (b. 1961), all born in different countries.  She died in 1998, in Spain, aged 65. She was buried in the Kemerton churchyard where two of her children were already interred.

References

1932 births
1998 deaths
Welsh mathematicians
British women mathematicians
People from Carmarthen
Alumni of Somerville College, Oxford
University of Warsaw alumni
Academics of City, University of London
20th-century British mathematicians
Topologists
20th-century women mathematicians